Chumeh-ye Kuchak (also Romanized as Chūmeh-ye Kūchak) is a village in Hoseyni Rural District, in the Central District of Shadegan County, Khuzestan Province, Iran. At the 2006 census, its population was 260, in 30 families.

References 

Populated places in Shadegan County